Elisabeth Volkmann (16 March 1936 – 27 July 2006) was a German actress and comedian, best known for her part in the German absurd comedy series  (1973–1979), which was watched by millions of viewers in Germany and, later on, as the voice of Marge Simpson in the German dub of The Simpsons. Volkmann was born in Essen and died in Munich.

Filmography

Radioplay 
 Die drei ??? (Three Investigators): Die Karten des Bösen, publisher: Europa (Sony Music) as Milva Summer (based on the novel by André Minninger)

References

External links 

Elisabeth Volkmann at the German Dubbing Card Index

1936 births
2006 deaths
Actors from Essen
German television actresses
German voice actresses
20th-century German actresses